David Quarrey  (born 1966) is a British diplomat and the British Ambassador to NATO since 2022. He was formerly acting National Security Adviser, having taken over the role while David Frost continued as the United Kingdom's Chief Negotiator to the European Union during the Brexit negotiations. He was the UK's Ambassador to Israel from 2015 to 2019.

Career
Quarrey, who joined the Foreign and Commonwealth Office in 1994, previously directed its Near East and North Africa Department. When Tony Blair was British prime minister, he was his private secretary for two years.

Quarrey's term as Ambassador to Israel ended in June 2019. He was replaced by Neil Wigan.

Quarrey was previously Prime Minister Boris Johnson's International Affairs Adviser and Deputy National Security Adviser. In April 2022 he was appointed as the British Ambassador to NATO.

Personal life
Quarrey was Britain's first openly homosexual Ambassador to Israel. His husband is Aldo Oliver Henriquez.

In 2021, he tested positive for the Indian variant of COVID-19 after returning from a government business trip to India.

References

External links
 David Quarrey CMG. Retrieved 3 November 2019.

1956 births
Living people
Ambassadors of the United Kingdom to Israel
Companions of the Order of St Michael and St George
Gay diplomats
British LGBT civil servants
English LGBT people
Members of HM Diplomatic Service
20th-century British diplomats
21st-century British diplomats
Permanent Representatives of the United Kingdom to NATO